BL-1020 (perphenazine 4-aminobutanoate) is an investigational orally-active antipsychotic for the possible treatment of schizophrenia. The chemical is an ester of GABA and perphenazine; pharmacologically it acts as a D2 antagonist and GABA agonist. It has shown pro-cognitive effects in the trials. In March 2013, it went into the II/III trial phase. It has been introduced by BioLineRx, a biopharmaceutical development company.

References 

5-HT2A antagonists
Antipsychotics
D2 antagonists
GABA receptor agonists
Chloroarenes
Piperazines